The Jacksonville Tarpons were a minor league baseball team based in Jacksonville, Florida. They played in the Class-C South Atlantic League from 1904 through 1917. They were originally named the Jacksonville Jays from 1904 to 1910, then were the Tarpons through 1916 before being the Jacksonville Roses  their last season in 1917.

References

External links
Baseball Reference

Baseball teams established in 1904
Baseball teams disestablished in 1917
South Atlantic League (1904–1963) teams
Baseball in Jacksonville, Florida
1904 establishments in Florida
1917 disestablishments in Florida
Defunct baseball teams in Florida
Defunct South Atlantic League teams